Solomon Fowler Mansion is a historic home located at Bristol, Elkhart County, Indiana.  It was built in 1868–1869, and is a two-story, Italianate style brick dwelling.  It has a rear kitchen wing, arched openings, and a moderately pitched hipped roof topped by a cupola.  Also on the property are the contributing stone fence, pump and well, tennis courts, and surrounding landscape.

It was added to the National Register of Historic Places in 2003.

References

Houses on the National Register of Historic Places in Indiana
Italianate architecture in Indiana
Houses completed in 1869
Houses in Elkhart County, Indiana
National Register of Historic Places in Elkhart County, Indiana